Vesiloo is a small, uninhabited Estonian island in the Baltic Sea.

Vesiloo lies just off the northern coast of the island of Vilsandi. The water between the two islands is shallow enough to enable access to each by wading through the sea. It is administered by Saaremaa Municipality, Saare County and is part of the Vilsandi National Park.

See also
 List of islands of Estonia

References

Uninhabited islands of Estonia
Saaremaa Parish
Estonian islands in the Baltic